D. juncea may refer to:

 Dampiera juncea, a plant with yellow-centred flowers
 Daphnobela juncea, an extinct mollusc
 Dicerca juncea, a jewel beetle
 Diostea juncea, a dicotyledonous plant